The Weekend Sun is a regional newspaper based in the Bay Of Plenty. It is published every Friday by Sun Media and sent free of cost. Its total circulation exceeds 60,000 papers every Friday, more than any other regional newspaper in the region. (Bay of Plenty Times has 20,000 each day Mon-Sat)

History
Sun Media was made in 2000 along with the Weekend Sun, Coast & Country and Waterline Magazine.

References

Newspapers published in New Zealand
Bay of Plenty Region
Mass media in Tauranga